The Death-Defying Pepper Roux is a children's book by British children's author Geraldine McCaughrean.

The book was published by Oxford University Press October 1, 2009 and by HarperCollins January 19, 2010.

Plot
The story is about a boy who was to die at fourteen. But, as his fourteenth birthday passes, he is still alive and he begins to unravel the truth as the story goes on. He runs away from his home only to find more devils and angels waiting for him – or are they? None of these angels of death and horses of fire seem to be coming for him. Pepper begins to doubt that he is going to die young - maybe the entire prophecy was a lie? Naïve and trusting, pepper sets a course through dangerous waters, inviting disasters and mayhem at every turn, one eye on the sky for fear of angels, one on the magnificent possibilities of being alive.

Reception

In 2011, the book was selected for a top ten spot on the American Library Association's Rainbow List  and was named in the Top 100 Best Fiction for Young Adults.

The book was also shortlisted for the 2011 CILIP Carnegie Medal.

References

2010 British novels
British children's novels
Novels set in France
2010 children's books
Oxford University Press books